Haematin (also known as hematin, ferriheme, hematosin, hydroxyhemin, oxyheme, phenodin, or oxyhemochromogen) is a dark bluish or brownish pigment containing iron in the ferric state, obtained by the oxidation of haem.

Haematin inhibits the synthesis of porphyrin, and stimulates the synthesis of globin. It is a component of cytochromes and peroxidases, and is also used as a reagent.

References 

Iron(III) compounds
Pigments